The 2000 Holiday Bowl was a college football bowl game played December 29, 2000 in San Diego, California. It was part of the 2000 NCAA Division I-A football season. It featured the Oregon Ducks and the Texas Longhorns. Oregon won the game by a final score of 35–30.

Game summary
Oregon – Justin Peelle 1 yard touchdown from Joey Harrington (Josh Frankel kick), 6:25
Oregon – Joey Harrington 18 yard touchdown from Keenan Howry (Josh Frankel kick), 12:41
Texas – Hodges Mitchell 3 yard touchdown run (Kris Stockton kick), 4:21
Texas – Chris Simms 4 yard touchdown run (Kris Stockton kick), 10:46
Texas – Greg Brown 23 yard interception return (Kris Stockton kick), 11:14
Oregon – Maurice Morris 55 yard touchdown from Joey Harrington (Josh Frankel kick), 2:28
Oregon – Joey Harrington 9 yard touchdown run (Josh Frankel kick), 5:17
Texas – Victor Ike 93 yard kickoff return (Kris Stockton kick), 5:35
Oregon – Jason Willis 4 yard touchdown run (Josh Frankel kick), 9:14
Texas – Safety, 14:39

Oregon scored first when quarterback Joey Harrington threw a one yard touchdown pass to tight end Justin Peelle, which gave the Ducks an early 7–0 lead.  Later in the first quarter, wide receiver Keenan Howry threw an 18 yard touchdown pass to Harrington on a trick play for a 14–0 Duck lead.

Texas responded after running back Hodges Mitchell scored on a three yard touchdown run, making it 14–7.  Texas Quarterback Chris Simms later tied the game at 14–14 on a four-yard touchdown run.  30 seconds later, cornerback Greg Brown intercepted a pass and returned it 23 yards for a touchdown, putting Texas up 21–14. That score held up until halftime.

In the third quarter, Joey Harrington threw a 55 yard touchdown pass to running back Maurice Morris, and Oregon tied the game at 21.  In the fourth quarter, Oregon reclaimed the lead after Harrington ran for a nine-yard touchdown score, which gave the Ducks a 28–21 lead.  On the ensuing kickoff, a mere 17 seconds later, Victor Ike of Texas returned it 93 yards for a touchdown which evened the score at 28.  Jason Willis of Oregon scored the go ahead touchdown run to give Oregon a 35–28 lead.  A Texas safety, moved Texas within 35–30, which held up to be the final score, as Texas drove down the field after the safety but dropped potential touchdown passes to end the drive.

Statistics

References

Holiday Bowl
Holiday Bowl
Oregon Ducks football bowl games
Texas Longhorns football bowl games
Holiday Bowl
December 2000 sports events in the United States